Georgios Toursounidis (Greek: Γεώργιος Τουρσουνίδης; born 21 August 1970) is a retired Greek footballer. He played for PAOK and Xanthi.

Toursounidis was born in 1970. He made 263 league appearances for PAOK, scoring 35 goals, and became a fan favorite due to his work ethic and obsession with the club. His most memorable game for PAOK was an away game against bitter rivals Aris Thessaloniki, with PAOK winning by a score of 4–0, when Toursounidis scored twice. He left PAOK in 1999, spending two seasons at Skoda Xanthi. In January 2002 Toursounidis signed a six-month contract with PAOK and retired after the end of the season.

He was influential in the Greek national side's progression to the 1994 World Cup, but was left out of the finals side as manager Alketas Panagoulias preferred more experienced players. Toursounidis did not play for Greece again.

References

1970 births
Living people
Greek footballers
Greece international footballers
Super League Greece players
PAOK FC players
Xanthi F.C. players
Association football midfielders
Footballers from Thessaloniki